Telos is a quarterly peer-reviewed academic journal established in May 1968 with the intention of providing the New Left with a coherent theoretical perspective.

History
The journal sought to expand the Husserlian diagnosis of "the crisis of European sciences" to prefigure a particular program of social reconstruction relevant for the United States. In order to avoid the high level of abstraction typical of Husserlian phenomenology, the journal began introducing the ideas of Western Marxism and of the critical theory of the Frankfurt School.

With the disintegration of the New Left and the gradual integration of what remained of the American Left within the Democratic Party, Telos became increasingly critical of the Left in general. It subsequently undertook a reevaluation of 20th century intellectual history, focusing primarily on forgotten and repressed authors and ideas, beginning with Carl Schmitt and American populism. Eventually the journal rejected the traditional divisions between Left and Right as a legitimating mechanism for new class domination and an occlusion of new, post-Fordist political conflicts. This led to a reevaluation of the primacy of culture and to efforts to understand the dynamics of cultural disintegration and reintegration as a precondition for the constitution of that autonomous individuality critical theory had always identified as the telos of Western civilization.

The journal is published by Telos Press Publishing and the editor-in-chief is David Pan. It is affiliated with the Telos Institute, which hosts annual conferences of which the proceedings are often published in Telos.

Abstracting and indexing 
The journal is abstracted and indexed in the Social Sciences Citation Index, Arts & Humanities Citation Index, Current Contents/Social & Behavioral Sciences, and Current Contents/Arts & Humanities. According to the Journal Citation Reports, the journal has a 2013 impact factor of 0.065, ranking it 133rd out of 138 journals in the category "Sociology".

Telos Press Publishing
Telos Press Publishing was founded by Paul Piccone, the first editor-in-chief of Telos, and is the publisher of both the journal Telos as well as a separate book line. It is based in Candor, New York.

References

External links
 
 Telos Press Publishing

1968 establishments in New York (state)
Academic publishing companies
Book publishing companies of the United States
Critical theory
Cultural journals
English-language journals
Political philosophy journals
Political book publishing companies
Political science journals
Publications established in 1968
Publishing companies established in 1968
Quarterly journals